Anna Dale (born 1971) is an English novelist for children's literature, who rose to prominence after her novel, Whispering to Witches, was published in 2004.

Early life
Dale was born in 1971, and lived in Suffolk and Hampshire before settling in Essex when she was seven. Dale spent most of her childhood in a village called Writtle, and attended the local grammar school.

She left Writtle to study History at the University of Kent at Canterbury, and she lived in Canterbury for three years. Later, when she came to write Whispering to Witches, she drew on her memories of student days in Canterbury. She then got an MA in Writing for Children from King Alfred's College in Winchester.

Career
She was working as a bookshop assistant in Southampton when Whispering to Witches was picked up by Bloomsbury Publishing, publisher of the Harry Potter books. The book was reprinted several times and was distributed in 12 countries.

Works
 Whispering to Witches (2004)
 Dawn Undercover (2005)
 Spellbound (2008)
 Magical Mischief (2010)

References

English women novelists
1971 births
Living people
21st-century English novelists
Alumni of the University of Kent
British women children's writers
21st-century English women writers
People from Writtle